Parliament House, in Lambton Quay, Wellington, is the main building of the New Zealand Parliament Buildings. It contains the Parliament's debating chamber, speaker's office, visitors' centre, and committee rooms. It was built between 1914 and 1922, replacing an earlier building that burned down in 1907. Parliament started using the yet to be completed building from 1918. Parliament House was extensively earthquake strengthened and refurbished between 1991 and 1995. It is open for visitors almost every day of the year, and is one of Wellington's major visitor attractions. Parliament House is a Category I heritage building registered by Heritage New Zealand.

Exterior architecture and design
Parliament House was designed in an Edwardian neoclassical style. It was deliberately designed to display New Zealand materials; the building is faced with Tākaka marble, with a base course of Coromandel granite. Major architectural features of the building exterior include a colonnade lining the front and a long set of steps leading to the main entrance.

Interior
At the centre of Parliament House is the debating chamber. It has a raised roof above galleries that circle the debating floor below. The chamber has rimu-panelled walls and, in commemoration of the colour scheme of the British House of Commons, the leather seats and carpets are green. The debating floor's seating plan accommodates up to 123 members (120 normally, plus any overhang seats).

History
On 11 December 1907, the original Parliament House burned to the ground, along with all other parliament buildings except the library. The Liberal Government took this as an opportunity to completely redesign the seat of government, with unified buildings in permanent materials for the politicians and the supporting administration. A museum was allowed for and the public servants would move across from the Old Government Buildings on Lambton Quay.

A competition to find a replacement design was announced by Prime Minister Joseph Ward in February 1911 and 33 designs were entered. The winning design, by government architect John Campbell, was selected by Colonel Vernon, former government architect for New South Wales. As another of Campbell's entries won fourth place, the actual design is a combination of both entries. The design was divided into two stages. The first half, a Neoclassical building, contained both chambers and the second half Bellamy's and a new Gothic Revival library to replace the existing one.

Despite cost concerns, Prime Minister William Massey let construction of the first stage begin in 1914, but without much of the roof ornamentation or the roof domes. The outbreak of World War I created labour and material shortages that made construction difficult, and the choice of Takaka marble added a logistical challenge to the building process. Chosen on account of its strength and polished finish, over 5000 tonnes would be utilised for build materials. By 1917 the top floor had been added and the grounds had been levelled, but everything was behind schedule. Although the building was unfinished, MPs moved into it in 1918 to get out of the old, cramped Government House (on the site now occupied by the Beehive). In 1922, the first stage was completed; the second stage was never built.

It was designed by Sir Thomas Brock of England.

1990s restoration and strengthening

During the 1980s, there were discussions about earthquake risk, and the exterior of Parliament House had started to look shabby. There was even discussion about demolishing it. In 1989, the New Zealand Historic Places Trust (now known as Heritage New Zealand Pouhere Taonga) assigned the highest heritage rating to the building – Category I. This helped convince the decision makers to have the building strengthened and renovated, and what was up to then New Zealand's largest heritage building conservation project began. In 1991, members moved across to Bowen House, where a temporary debating chamber had been built. Base isolation was installed, and at its peak, 400 workers were on site plus an additional 300 people were working offsite on the project. The renovated building was officially opened in November 1995 by Elizabeth II, Queen of New Zealand, after its comprehensive strengthening and refurbishment. The parliamentarians had their first session in the renovated building in February 1996.

The intention of the Liberal Government had been for the design to be implemented in stages, eventually resulting in a coherent architectural setting. Instead, as Heritage New Zealand remarks, the setting that has been achieved "has little aesthetic or architectural coherence", especially through the construction of the Beehive instead of completion of Parliament House.

Visiting and tours
Parliament is open to the public every day apart from some key public holidays; entry is subject to security screening. Free one-hour tours are offered between 10 am and 4 pm on the full hour. Access to the public galleries above the debating chamber is not part of the tour, is only possible on days the house is sitting, and a dress code applies. Parliament House has a visitor centre, with opening hours slightly longer than the times during which tours are offered.

Photo gallery

References

External links

Virtual tour of the Parliament Buildings
Parliament House entry at Heritage New Zealand

Buildings and structures in Wellington City
Government buildings completed in 1922
Heritage New Zealand Category 1 historic places in the Wellington Region
Politics of New Zealand
Tourist attractions in Wellington City
1920s architecture in New Zealand
Neoclassical architecture in New Zealand
John Campbell (architect) buildings